The 1888 South Longford by-election was a parliamentary by-election held for the United Kingdom House of Commons constituency of South Longford on 30 June 1888. The vacancy arose because of the resignation of the sitting member, Laurence Connolly of the Irish Parliamentary Party. Only one candidate was nominated, James Gubbins Fitzgerald of the Irish Parliamentary Party, who was elected unopposed.

References

By-elections to the Parliament of the United Kingdom in County Longford constituencies
1888 elections in the United Kingdom
Unopposed by-elections to the Parliament of the United Kingdom in Irish constituencies
June 1888 events
1888 elections in Ireland